Tenth Legion is an unincorporated area in Rockingham County, Virginia, United States.

Geography 
Tenth Legion is located near Interstate 81 about 4.4 mi southeast of the town of Broadway.

References

Unincorporated communities in Virginia